Fermo Favini, also known as Mino Favini (2 February 1936 – 23 April 2019) was an Italian professional footballer who played for Meda, Como, Brescia, Atalanta and Reggiana. He later worked as a scout for Atalanta.

References

1936 births
2019 deaths
Italian footballers
A.C. Meda 1913 players
Como 1907 players
Brescia Calcio players
Atalanta B.C. players
A.C. Reggiana 1919 players
Association football scouts
Atalanta B.C. non-playing staff
People from Meda
Association footballers not categorized by position
Footballers from Lombardy
Sportspeople from the Province of Monza e Brianza